Bulgarians in Croatia are one of 22 national minorities in Croatia. According to the last census from 2011, there were 872 Bulgarians living in Croatia, from which most of them lived in Zagreb.

Bulgarians are officially recognized as an autochthonous national minority, and as such, they elect a special representative to the Croatian Parliament, shared with members of eleven other national minorities.

Number of Bulgarians

2011 census

Notable people 

 Nikolaj Pešalov (b. 1970), weightlifter
 Marianna Radev (1913–1973), contralto
 Dubravka Ugrešić (1949–2023), writer, Bulgarian mother

See also 
 Bulgaria–Croatia relations

External links
Bulgarians in Croatia

References

Croatia
Ethnic groups in Croatia